Romanticism is a triannual peer-reviewed academic journal dedicated to Romantic studies, focusing on the period 1750-1850. It was established in 1995 and is published by Edinburgh University Press.

External links 
 

Publications established in 1995
European history journals
Triannual journals
Edinburgh University Press academic journals
English-language journals